The 2008 Pacific Curling Championships took place in Naseby, New Zealand from 2–9 November 2008. The top two finishers of the men's event competed in the 2009 Ford World Men's Curling Championship, while women's winner China and host country South Korea competed in the 2009 World Women's Curling Championship, with China winning its first world title.

Men

Teams

Round Robin Standings

Round Robin results

Draw 1
Sunday, 2 November 12:30

Draw 2
Sunday, 2 November 20:30

Draw 3
Monday, 3 November 12:00

Draw 4
Monday, 3 November 20:00

Draw 5
Tuesday, 4 November 14:30

Draw 6
Wednesday, 5 November 08:00

Draw 7
Wednesday, 5 November 16:00

Draw 8
Thursday, 6 November 10:00

Draw 9
Thursday, 6 November 19:00

Draw 10
Friday, 7 November 12:00

Playoffs
There was a best of 5 series for the semi-finals.

Semifinals

Game 1
Saturday, 8 November 09:00

Game 2
Saturday, 8 November 14:00

Game 3
Saturday, 8 November 19:00

Bronze Medal Game
Sunday, 9 November 12:00

Gold Medal Game
Sunday, 9 November 12:00

Women's

Teams

Round Robin Standings

Round Robin results

Draw 1
Sunday, 2 November 16:30

Draw 2
Monday, 3 November 08:00

Draw 3
Monday, 3 November 16:00

Draw 4
Tuesday, 4 November 10:00

Draw 5
Tuesday, 4 November 19:00

Draw 6
Wednesday, 5 November 12:00

Draw 7
Wednesday, 5 November 20:00

Draw 8
Thursday, 6 November 14:30

Draw 9
Friday, 7 November 08:00

Draw 10
Friday, 7 November 16:00

Playoffs

The winner of the semifinals would go on to face China in the Gold Medal Game; the loser would receive the bronze medal.

Semifinals
Saturday, 8 November 09:00

Gold Medal Game
Sunday, 9 November 12:00

External links
 Official Results

References

2008 in curling
2008
Sport in Otago
2008 in New Zealand sport
International curling competitions hosted by New Zealand